The Twelve Inch Mixes is a compilation album by Spandau Ballet. It was released on 30 June 1986 by Chrysalis Records.

Track listings
All tracks are composed by Gary Kemp and all are mixes.

European CD
 "Gold" (12" Mix) – 7:20
 "Lifeline" (12" Version) – 5:20
 "Round and Round" (12" Version) – 5:35
 "Only When You Leave" (Extended Mix) – 6:22
 "Instinction" (Edit) – 3:37
 "Highly Re-Strung" (12" Version) – 5:30
 "True" (12" Version) – 6:08
 "Communication" (12" Version) – 4:30
 "I'll Fly for You" (12" Version) – 5:37
 "To Cut a Long Story Short" (12" Version) – 6:04
 "Chant No. 1 (I Don't Need This Pressure On)" (12" Version) – 5:48
 "The Freeze" (12" Version) – 6:33
 "Muscle Bound" (12" Version) – 4:53

Double LP and Japanese 2CD
Side one
Produced by Tony Swain, Steve Jolley and Spandau Ballet.
 "Gold" (12" Mix) – 7:20
 "Lifeline" (12" Version) – 5:20
 "Round and Round" (Long Version) – 5:35
 "Only When You Leave" (Extended Mix) – 6:22

Side two
Produced by Tony Swain, Steve Jolley and Spandau Ballet, except "Instinstion" produced by R.J. Burgess and Trevor Horn.
 "Instinction" (Edit) – 3:37
 "Highly Re-Strung" (12" Version) – 5:30
 "True" (12" Version) – 6:08
 "Communication" (Club Mix) – 4:30

Side three
Produced by R.J. Burgess, except "I'll Fly For You" produced by Tony Swain, Steve Jolley and Spandau Ballet.
 "I'll Fly for You" (Long Version) – 5:37
 "To Cut a Long Story Short" (12" Version) – 6:30 *
 "Chant No. 1 (I Don't Need This Pressure On)" (12" Version) – 5:48 **
 "She Loved Like Diamond" (Extended Version) – 3:38

Side four
Produced by R.J. Burgess.
 "Paint Me Down" (12" Version) – 7:06
 "The Freeze" (Special Mix) – 6:33
 "Musclebound" (Remix) – 4:53

Charts

References

1986 compilation albums
Spandau Ballet albums